Susan Johnson is a Lutheran minister, who has been National Bishop of the Evangelical Lutheran Church in Canada (ELCIC) since 2007. She is the first woman to hold the post.

Prior to her ordination to the episcopate, she was an Assistant to the Bishop in Eastern Synod, which covers Central Canada and the Maritimes. From 2001 to 2005, she was Vice-President of the ELCIC.

Johnson was consecrated by fellow Lutheran and Anglican bishops in Winnipeg on the feast of Michael and All Angels, 2007. She is an honorary canon of Christ's Church Cathedral (Hamilton).

References

External links 
 ELCIC:From the bishop
 ELCIC:Susan Johnson

Living people
Women Lutheran bishops
21st-century Lutheran bishops
National Bishops of Canada
Year of birth missing (living people)